Sir Ivan Manuel Menezes (born July 1959) is an Indian-born American/British business executive. He has been the chief executive officer (CEO) of Diageo, a FTSE 100 British multinational alcoholic beverages company, since 1 July 2013, succeeding Paul S. Walsh.

Early life 
Menezes was born in Pune, India in July 1959, the son of Manuel Menezes, who was the chairman of the Indian Railway Board. His brother Victor Menezes is the former chairman and CEO of Citibank.

He was educated at St. Stephen's College, Delhi and Indian Institute of Management Ahmedabad, and the Northwestern University's Kellogg School of Management.

Career 
Menezes joined Diageo in 1997 and has held various senior positions including: Chief Operating Officer; Chairman, Latin America & the Caribbean; Chairman, Asia Pacific; President and CEO, Diageo North America; and Chief Operating Officer, Diageo North America. Menezes is a non-executive director of the US-based fashion retailer Coach, Inc.

He was knighted in the 2023 New Year Honours for services to business and equality.

Personal life 
He is married and has two children.

References 

1959 births
American chief executives
Living people
St. Stephen's College, Delhi alumni
Businesspeople from Pune
Diageo people
Knights Bachelor
Indian emigrants to the United States
Naturalized citizens of the United States
Naturalised citizens of the United Kingdom
British people of Indian descent